The 2020–21 NC State Wolfpack men's basketball team represented North Carolina State University during the 2020–21 NCAA Division I men's basketball season. The Wolfpack were led by fourth-year head coach Kevin Keatts and played their home games at PNC Arena in Raleigh, North Carolina as members of the Atlantic Coast Conference (ACC).

The Wolfpack finished the season 14–11, and 9–8 in ACC play to finish in ninth place.  As the ninth seed in the ACC tournament, they lost to Syracuse in the first round.  They earned an at-large bid to the NIT.  As the third seed in the Colorado State bracket, they defeated Davidson in the First Round, before losing to Colorado State in the Quarterfinals.

Previous season
The Wolfpack finished the 2019–20 season 20–12, 10–10 in ACC play to finish in a tie for sixth place. The Wolfpack had earned the fifth seed in the 2020 ACC tournament before the tournament was canceled due to the COVID-19 pandemic.

Roster

Roster Source:

Schedule and results

Source:

|-
!colspan=12 style=| Regular season

|-
!colspan=12 style=| ACC Tournament

|-
!colspan=12 style=| NIT

Schedule Source:

Rankings

^Coaches did not release a Week 1 poll.

References

NC State Wolfpack men's basketball seasons
NC State
NC State Wolfpack men's basketball
NC State Wolfpack men's basketball
NC State